is a railway station on the Kagoshima Main Line and the Sasaguri Line operated by JR Kyushu in Hakata-ku, Fukuoka, Fukuoka Prefecture, Japan.

Lines

The station is also the starting point of the Sasaguri Line which is also, with parts of other lines, collectively referred to on maps as the Fukuhoku Yutaka Line.

Layout
The station consists of one side and two island platforms serving five elevated tracks.

History
This track was later extended to Hakata on 16 February 1905. When the Kyushu Railway was nationalized on 1 July 1907, Japanese Government Railways (JGR) took over control of the station. On 12 October 1909, the station became part of the Hitoyoshi Main Line while the track from Hakata through Yoshizuka to Sasaguri was designated the Sasaguri Line. On 21 November 1909 the Hitoyoshi Main Line was renamed the Kagoshima Main Line. On 5 May 1911, Yoshizuka was designated the official start point of the Sasaguri Line. With the privatization of Japanese National Railways (JNR), the successor of JGR, on 1 April 1987, JR Kyushu took over control of the station.

Passenger statistics
In fiscal 2016, the station was used by 13,812 passengers daily, and it ranked 8th among the busiest stations of JR Kyushu.

See also 
List of railway stations in Japan

References

External links
Yoshizuka Station (JR Kyushu)

Railway stations in Fukuoka Prefecture
Railway stations in Japan opened in 1890
Railway stations in Japan opened in 1904